Midnight breakfast is a generic term for a communal meal served at some American colleges and universities, often served during finals week. Menu items that are generally considered breakfast foods are served in the school's dining hall late at night (hence "midnight") as a study break before or during final exams, or as a traditional community-building event. Sometimes food is served by faculty and staff. Midnight breakfast is an occasional event and should not be confused with school dining facilities that operate 24 hours a day on a regular basis.

References

Breakfast
Academic meals
Student culture in the United States